The Smilgaitis is a river of Kėdainiai district municipality, Kaunas County, central Lithuania. It is a right tributary of the river Smilga.

Its source is nearby Krakės town. It flows through the Josvainiai forest, Meironiškiai, Ruseiniai villages and meets the Smilga river near Stasiūnai. Keleriškiai pond is dammed on the Smilgaitis river.

The name Smilgaitis comes from the Lithuanian word smilga ('bentgrass').

References

 LIETUVOS RESPUBLIKOS UPIŲ IR TVENKINIŲ KLASIFIKATORIUS (Republic of Lithuania- River and Pond Classifications).  Ministry of Environment (Lithuania). Accessed 2011-11-17.

Rivers of Lithuania
Kėdainiai District Municipality